Sirpur  is a village in Pakhanjore Tehsil, Kanker district, Chhattisgarh, India.

See also
Sirpur, Durg, a village in Dondiluhara tehsil, Durg district

References

Villages in Kanker district